Simon J. Williams, FAcSS (born 1961) is a British sociologist. He is Professor Emeritus of Sociology at the University of Warwick.

Biography

Simon Williams completed his doctoral thesis on the sociological dimensions of chronic respiratory illness and disability in 1990 at Royal Holloway and Bedford New College, University of London. He then worked as a Research Fellow at the University of Kent in the Centre for Health Services Studies from 1990-1992 before moving to a full-time lectureship in Sociology at the University of Warwick in 1992, where he has been ever since, becoming a full Professor of Sociology in 2006 and Emeritus Professor in October 2019.

Research

Williams' has researched a wide range of sociological topics and interdisciplinary issues during his career, including the body, emotion/affect, health and illness, pain, sleep, pharmaceuticals, and the neurosciences -- with particular reference to issues of cognitive enhancement. He also has newly emerging research interests in new digital health technologies, including AI assisted technologies in health and medicine.

The sociology and politics of sleep

Perhaps the most innovative aspect of Williams' work to date has been his contribution to the newly emerging sociology of sleep: a topic which until quite recently has received relatively little attention within sociology or the social sciences and humanities in general. His book Sleep and Society, for example, may be read as an early attempt to sketch the sociological dimensions and dynamics of sleep, including socio-cultural and historical variability in how, when, where and with whom we sleep; changing ideas, meanings and values associated with sleep through time, culture and context; the contested nature and status of sleep rights and sleep roles in the 24/7 society; the embodied and embedded nature of sleep in everyday/night life; the social patterning and social organisation of sleep; and the medicalisation of sleep. Further collaborative research has also been conducted on the social construction of sleep in the news, and sleep deprivation as a hidden dimension of domestic violence.

His latest book, The Politics of Sleep, examines the increasingly 'politicised' nature of sleep today as a matter of controversy, contestation and concern, thereby linking sleep to prevailing socio-political discourses and debates concerning rights, risks and responsibilities in the late modern age and associated questions of citizenship, enterprise and enhancement in neo-liberal times. Sleep indeed, Williams argues, is another vital part of the 'politics of life' and the 'governance of bodies' today.

The social sciences and humanities too, Williams suggests, are implicated in these very processes and dynamics, thereby further profiling, promoting or problematising and hence politicising sleep, both inside and outside the academy, the laboratory and the clinic. This for example, includes recent sociological research on: gender, sleep and the life course; the social and health patterning of sleep quality and duration, and; the medicalisation of sleep. Comparative historical and cross-cultural research is also now shedding further valuable new light on a range of sleep-related matters such as the transformation of sleep science; sleep in (pre)industrial times, and; sleep and night-time in Asia and the West.  This research in turn raises important questions as to what 'normal' sleep is, for whom, when and where, thereby further problematising and politicising sleep, past, present and future.

All in all this adds up to a rich and vibrant new interdisciplinary area of research on 'sleep, culture and society' that complements and extends existing work in sleep science, sleep medicine and cognate fields of inquiry.

These issues have recently been further discussed and debated online in 'Somatosphere' with the American medical anthropologist Matthew Wolf-Meyer.

Williams' continues to write on these matters, including a forthcoming (co-authored) book on "TechnoSleep: Frontiers, Fictions, Futures." He is also now beginning to write on the social, cultural and political life of chronobiology in society, which includes but extends beyond just sleep matters.

Honours
In September 2014, Williams was elected a Fellow of the Academy of Social Sciences.

Selected bibliography

Books
 
 
 
 
 
 
 
 
 
 
 
  Preview.
 Meloni, M, Williams, S.J. and Martin P. (eds) (2016) Biosocial Matters: Rethinking Sociology-Biology Relations in the Twenty-First Century. Oxford: Wiley.Blackwell.

Articles 
  Article for the School of Life series.

References

External links
 Profile page: Simon J. Williams Warwick University
 Amazon profile
 'Sleep Cultures' website.
 Debate in 'Somatosphere' on the future of sleep research in the social sciences

British sociologists
Living people
1961 births
Fellows of the Academy of Social Sciences
Academics of the University of Warwick